Hyphoderma is a genus of crust fungi in the family Meruliaceae. It was circumscribed by German botanist Karl Friedrich Wilhelm Wallroth in 1833.

Species
, Index Fungorum accepts 102 species of Hyphoderma:

References

Taxa described in 1833
Meruliaceae
Polyporales genera
Taxa named by Karl Friedrich Wilhelm Wallroth